The Yakovlev Yak-58 is a small, multi-role utility transport and business aircraft. The aircraft features a pusher engine and twin boom tail. It saw limited production in the late 1990s.

Design and development
Following the collapse of the Soviet Union, as military contracts evaporated, the Yakovlev design bureau was forced to convert to designing civilian aircraft to stay in business. Their first post-Soviet design was the Yak-58, a small multi-role utility transport designed to appeal to as many prospective buyers as possible.

The Yak-58 is a low-winged monoplane of pusher configuration, powered by a Vedeneyev M14PT radial engine mounted at the rear of the fuselage nacelle, driving a three-bladed propeller. Rather than conventional tailbooms, the two highly swept fins were mounted directly to the wing, and were joined by the tailplane. The undercarriage is a retractable tricycle arrangement. Seats are fitted for a pilot and five passengers, with the option of replacing the passengers by 450 kg (990 kg) of cargo.

Testing
The first prototype made its maiden flight at Tbilisi, Georgia on 26 December 1993, although some sources state that the first flight did not occur until 17 April 1994. This aircraft was wrecked in a fatal crash at the ILA Berlin Air Show on 27 May 1994, with the second prototype flying on 10 October 1994.

Yakovlev claimed in 1997 that it had orders for 250 Yak-58s, with an ELINT version and a version replacing the radial engine with a turboprop planned. Limited production occurred at Tbilisi, however, due to funding problems and political problems between Georgia and Russia, Yakovlev attempted to restart the project in 2003, possibly with production moved back to Russia.

Specifications (Yak-58)

See also

References

Bibliography

 Gordon, Yefim, Dmitry Komissarov and Sergey Komissarov. OKB Yakovlev: A History of the Design Bureau and its Aircraft. Hinkley, UK: Midland Publishing, 2005. .
 Gunston, Bill and Yefim Gordon. Yakovlev Aircraft since 1924. London, UK: Putnam Aeronautical Books, 1997. .
 "ILA '94 Show News: Crash deaths blight Berlin show opening". Flight International, 8–14 June 1994. p. 10.
 Taylor, Michael J. H. Brassey's World Aircraft & Systems Directory 1999/2000 Edition. London: Brassey's, 1999. .

External links
 Official page

1990s Soviet and Russian civil utility aircraft
Yak-058
Single-engined pusher aircraft
Twin-boom aircraft
Low-wing aircraft
Aircraft first flown in 1993